Victoria Kisyombe is a Tanzanian Entrepreneur and founder of Sero Lease and Finance Limited (Selfina) in 2002, a Tanzanian company that micro-leasing to mostly widows and young girls. She received an Outstanding Social Entrepreneur Award from the World Economic Forum and Schwab Foundation for Social Entrepreneurs in 2010.

Background and education 
Victoria Kisyomb is originally from Mbeya in South-Wester part of Tanzania. She studied her primary and school education from Mbeya before moving to Kenya to further her studies and She later returned to Tanzania and attended University of Dar es Salaam, where she completed a bachelor's degree in Veterinary Science in 1983. In 1986 she was awarded a scholarship by Edinburgh University to complete a Master's degree in Veterinary Science.

Career 
After finishing her studies at the University of Dar es Salaam she returned to Mbeya and started to practice as a vet in 1983. She is currently a permanent Member of Schwab Foundation/World Economic Forum, Emeritus Council Member of World Economic Forum New Growth Models, Women Global Banking Alliance which is based in USA, Emeritus Council Member of United Evangelical Mission (UEM, Germany).

References 

Living people
Year of birth missing (living people)
Tanzanian women in business
People from Mbeya Region
University of Dar es Salaam alumni
Alumni of the University of Edinburgh